Special cities are one of the first-level administrative divisions within South Korea. There is one first-level city in South Korea: Seoul.

Position in hierarchy and types
Special cities have equal status to provinces in the South Korean administrative scheme, and are among the highest-ranked administrative divisions of South Korea. There are three kinds of first-level city in South Korea.

 Seoul was designated a "special free city" (teukbyeol jayusi;) separate from Gyeonggi Province on August 15, 1946; it became a "special city" on August 15, 1949.
 Metropolitan cities were called "direct control (meaning directly-administered) city" (jikhalsi;) before 1995.

Administration
In South Korean special city and metropolitan cities, the Mayor is the highest-ranking official in charge. The Mayor is directly elected by the people registered in the city for a duration of four years. e.g. Mayor of Seoul.

Metropolitan functions such as water supply and public transport are integrated into the sole prefecture other than scattered to each municipality.

List of metropolitan cities

Notes: There are no Hanja for "Seoul"; in Chinese, it is written as /, a transcription based on the pronunciation of "Seoul". As a suffix, the character Gyeong (/) is used, which means "capital".

Specific cities that meet the minimum requirements for Metropolitan city status but have not yet been nominated
 Suwon (수원시 / ) - Population: 1,194,465; Area: 121.04 km2; Density: 9,868.34 /km2
 Changwon (창원시 / ) - Population: 1,054,154; Area: 747.12 km2; Density: 1,410.95 /km2
 Yongin (용인시 / ) - Population: 1,048,832; Area: 591.32 km2; Density: 1,773.71 /km2
 Goyang (고양시 / ) - Population: 1,043,035; Area: 267.41 km2; Density: 3,900.50 /km2

Specific cities with more than 900,000
 Seongnam (성남시 / ) - Population: 942,649; Area: 141.72 km2; Density: 6,651.48 /km2

See also
 Administrative divisions of South Korea
 Cities of South Korea
 List of cities in South Korea
 Provinces of South Korea
 Special cities of North Korea

References

 
Special